Paralus was a historical settlement located at one of the seven mouths of the Nile, Egypt known as Paralus or Sebennys.  During Byzantine times it was located in the province of Ægyptus Secunda. The place, mentioned in the Notitia Episcopatuum, has been abandoned and is now covered with the waters of Lake Burullus. 

The city was mentioned by Heroditus

Bishops of Paralas
The town was the seat of an ancient bishopric. Several are known to us: 
 Athanasius, assisted at the Council of Ephesus, in 431  
 Pasmeius was present at the Robber Council of Ephesus, 449, and at the Council of Chalcedon,
 Un-named Jacobite Bishop 
 Un-named Jacobite Bishop

The bishopric of Paralus is today included in the Catholic Church's list titular sees.

References 

Lakes of Egypt
Catholic titular sees in Africa